The 1971–72 Boise State Broncos men's basketball team represented Boise State College during the 1971–72 NCAA University Division basketball season. The Broncos were led by seventh-year head coach Murray Satterfield, and played their home games on campus at Bronco Gymnasium in Boise, Idaho.

No Broncos were named to the all-conference team, though four were honorable mention: guard Booker Brown and forwards Greg Bunn, Bill Cottrell, and Steve Wallace.

There was no conference tournament, which debuted four years later in 1976.

See also

1971–72 NCAA University Division men's basketball season
1971 in sports

References

External links
Sports Reference – Boise State Broncos – 1971–72 basketball season

Boise State Broncos men's basketball seasons
Boise State
Boise State